The Legend of the Lone Ranger is a 1981 American Western adventure film directed by William A. Fraker and starring Klinton Spilsbury, Michael Horse and Christopher Lloyd. It is based on the story of The Lone Ranger, a Western character created by George W. Trendle and Fran Striker.

Producers outraged fans by refusing to allow previous Lone Ranger actor Clayton Moore to wear the character's mask during public appearances, and created further bad publicity when it became known that the voice of leading man Spilsbury was dubbed by another actor, James Keach. The film was a critical and commercial failure, and Spilsbury has not appeared in any films since.

Plot

In 1854 in Texas, the outlaw Butch Cavendish (Christopher Lloyd) and his gang of outlaws are chasing a young Comanche boy. He rides into a thicket and falls off his horse and down an embankment. A boy who was already there hides him and the outlaws turn their attention to a small village, and kill everyone except the boy, John Reid (Marc Gilpin). The Indian boy, whose name is Tonto, takes John to his reservation, where Tonto (Patrick Montoya) teaches him to shoot a bow and arrow with precision, how to fight, and overall the way they live. The two eventually become blood brothers, and John later leaves the reservation for Detroit, grows up to become a lawyer, and takes a stagecoach to a town to set up his law practice. The coach is robbed by Cavendish’s gang, with the shotgun rider getting killed and the driver wounded. John stops the coach and the outlaws take a mailbag containing property deeds. At the town, John meets the uncle (the owner of the local newspaper) of a beautiful young woman named Amy who was on the same stagecoach as John. John tells them he is going to the Texas Rangers station to visit his brother Dan. During his visit, word reaches them about the whereabouts of Cavendish after some of the gang ride into town during a festival and kill Amy’s uncle. Collins, one of the Rangers, rides ahead to scout for signs of Cavendish, unbeknownst to the Rangers that he is part of Cavendish’s gang. Cavendish and his gang ambush the Rangers (Reid among them), killing all except Reid, who is rescued by Tonto. When John recovers from his wounds, Tonto teaches him to shoot with silver bullets, and he captures and tames a white horse, which he names Silver. He dedicates his life to fighting the crime that Cavendish represents. To this end, John becomes the great masked western hero, The Lone Ranger. Cavendish takes President Ulysses S. Grant (Jason Robards) hostage, revealing that he is attempting to take over Texas and secede it from the Union as his own independent country, using the President as a bargaining chip. John and Tonto sneak into the Cavendish compound and rescue Grant, and blow up the compound with dynamite they found while avoiding the guards. Cavendish attempts to flee the United States Cavalry, but John pursues and ultimately apprehends Cavendish, who is arrested. The President thanks John and Tonto, and the pair ride away as President Grant asks, “Who is that masked man?”

Cast
 Klinton Spilsbury (James Keach, voice) as John Reid/The Lone Ranger
 Marc Gilpin as young John
 Michael Horse as Tonto
 Patrick Montoya as young Tonto
 Christopher Lloyd as Maj. Bartholomew "Butch" Cavendish
 Matt Clark as Sheriff Wiatt
 Juanin Clay as Amy Striker
 Jason Robards as Ulysses S. Grant
 John Bennett Perry as Ranger Captain Dan Reid
 John Hart as Lucas Striker
 Richard Farnsworth as Wild Bill Hickok
 Ted Flicker as Buffalo Bill Cody
 Merle Haggard as Balladeer
 Lincoln Tate as George A. Custer
 Ted White as Mr. Reid
 Cheré Bryson as Mrs. Reid
 Bonita Granville as Woman (uncredited)

Cavendish gang
 Buck Taylor as Robert Edward Gattlin
 Tom Laughlin as Neeley
 Robert Hoy as Perlmutter
 Ted Gehring as Dale Wesley Stillwell
 Tom R. Diaz as Eastman
 Chuck Hayward as Wald
 Terry Leonard as Valentine
 Steve Meador as Russell
 Joe Finnegan as Westlake
 Roy Bonner as Richardson
 John M. Smith as Whitloff

Production

Development
The rights to the character had been bought in 1954 by Jack Wrather, an oil billionaire, and his wife Bonita Granville. They had made many attempts to create a Lone Ranger movie that would appeal to a modern audience, including making Tonto an equal partner and mentor to the Lone Ranger. By the late 1970s they believed that the story was ripe for retelling in an epic vein similar to Ilya and Alexander Salkind's Superman (1978), with the potential for sequels.

In October 1977 Lew Grade announced he would make the film as part of a slate of movies worth $97 million, including Love and Bullets, Escape to Athena, and Raise the Titanic. Most of the films Grade would finance himself but Lone Ranger was a co production with Wrather. Grade said the Lone Ranger would likely be played by an unknown, after a wide talent search. In October 1978 Grade said the film would be distributed by the new company Associated Film Distribution, a joint consortium between ITC Entertainment, EMI Films, and Marble Arch Productions.

"This is a grand old western in the heroic and glorious style of the cowboy picture," said Walter Coblentz, producer. "This is not Blazing Saddles. When he puts on his mask you're going to believe it."

Martin Starger said they were doing the film because "Heroes are needed today more than ever... We're playing it straight. This isn't a spoof or a satire."

Coblentz added, " I decided the Indian element needed upgrading. I decided to treat the Lone Ranger and Tonto more as equals. I wanted their relationship to be dignified. I wanted to take advantage of Indian lore."

In September 1979 Coblentz announced the director would be William Fraker. Fraker was normally a cinematographer but he had directed Monte Walsh which Coblentz admired.

William Fraker the director said "The Lone Ranger will work if we can make him real" and said he was influenced by Lawrence of Arabia.

Two of the movie's four screenwriters, Ivan Goff and Ben Roberts, had previously created the hit TV series Charlie's Angels; they had also worked together on another hit series, Mannix. According to Larry McMurtry, novelist George MacDonald Fraser had written an excellent script for the film, but he was not credited in the finished film.

Casting
Actors considered for the lead included Stephen Collins, Nicholas Guest, and Bruce Boxleitner. The part eventually went to Klinton Spilsbury, a photographer who had studied art (particularly sculpting) in New York. Spilsbury, whose father was a football coach at the University of Arizona, had grown up on a ranch in Chihuahua, Mexico. Spilsbury signed to a three-picture deal.

"He looked great in the mask, which seems like an odd thing to say,” Starger said. “But that was important because we had to find an actor whose eyes were not close together. The mask doesn’t look good if the eyes are too close.”

Tonto was played by Michael Horse, a silversmith by trade, whose only other acting experience had been a bit part in a Raquel Welch TV-movie. "For me this is an adventure and fun," he said. "Who knows if I can act. I'll soon find out. And if I'm a flop I'll just go off fishing." Horse would later make himself known as a supporting regular on David Lynch's prime-time experimental television series Twin Peaks.

Shooting
This film was shot in New Mexico, Utah, Colorado and California starting April 1980. Many scenes were shot in Monument Valley, Carson National Forest, Santa Fe National Forest, and Valley of Fire State Park. The fictional border town of Del Rio was constructed twenty miles outside Santa Fe, New Mexico.

Spilsbury was reportedly difficult during the shoot. “He came onto the set as if he was playing the role of a movie star,” says Lloyd. “I don’t know whether it was an affectation that he chose to bring with him, or whether he sincerely felt that that’s what was called for. And this was a problem from beginning to end. He did things that simply hindered the production.” This included getting involved in several brawls at night during the shoot.

The movie's ballad-narration, The Man in the Mask, was performed by country music artist Merle Haggard, and composed by John Barry with lyrics written by Dean Pitchford of Footloose and Sing fame.

The filmmakers were unhappy with Spilsbury's acting. "You just never believed what he was saying because he memorized the lines but he had never internalized them,” says Jim Van Wyck, who was a DGA assistant director trainee on the film. “It was like he was reading the script, but the intonations were wrong.” This dialogue was eventually overdubbed for the entire movie by actor James Keach.

"His inflections were a little strange, but I actually didn’t think he was that bad, to be honest with you,” says Keach. “I don’t know why they didn’t have him redo it. But it was a very well-paying job at the time, so I accepted it.”

Five horses were used to play Silver.

The film was part of a brief revival of the Western in 1980, which also included The Long Riders, Heaven's Gate and The Mountain Men.

Clayton Moore lawsuit
Part of the plan was to shoot a feature film with a new actor to replace the 65-year-old Clayton Moore, who had starred in the long-running and hugely successful television series for much of the 1950s.

Wrather had a vision for the retelling of the story, and he felt that the profile of the character would be devalued by Moore's continuing to appear in costume, as he had done for many years entertaining children in hospitals and appearing at county and state fairs. Also, he did not want audiences to believe that the aging Moore would reprise his role as the Lone Ranger. In 1975, Wrather asked Moore to stop portraying the character, but he refused. In 1979, the producers obtained a court injunction barring Moore from appearing in public with his trademark black mask. He was also permitted to sign autographs only as "The Masked Man." Moore responded by changing his costume slightly and replacing the mask with similar-looking wraparound sunglasses, and by cross-litigating against Wrather. The suit was eventually dismissed. Wrather finally allowed Moore to continue openly playing the character again in 1984 shortly before Wrather's death.

“I thought that was really kind of nasty and unnecessary,” said Christopher Lloyd. “Nothing Moore was doing was really interfering with the film. I thought that was kind of terrible.”

Release
The film was to have initially been released by AFD on December 19, 1980. However, the film was postponed to the summer of 1981 after the 1980 actors strike delayed post-production. AFD shut down in February 1981 after a series of unsuccessful films, particularly Raise the Titanic, and distribution was instead handled by Universal (who would eventually become the owner of the source material itself through its ownership of Classic Media's parent company, DreamWorks Animation), along with other Grade movies like On Golden Pond and The Great Muppet Caper. This resulted in the release of the film being pushed back. Spilsbury refused to do any publicity for the film.

Jack Wrather was good friends with Ronald and Nancy Reagan and the Reagans were to attend the premiere at the John F. Kennedy Center for the Performing Arts in Washington, D.C. Owing the attempted assassination of Ronald Reagan in March 1981, they did not but Reagan sent a tape record of congratulations to be played at the premiere.

Reception

Box office
The film was released in 1981 to massive negative publicity fueled by the above controversy and was shown on over 1,000 screens. The opening week was considered a disaster, making only $4 million. The film ultimately grossed just $12 million against its $18 million budget. Other contributing factors were the lack of public interest in Westerns by the 1980s and alterations to some fundamental elements of the Lone Ranger's character, such as his trademark silver bullets being made into magical talismans in the movie instead of mere symbolism.

Lew Grade, who invested in the movie, had managed to sell it to TV for $7.5 million, and also to HBO.

Marvin Starger claimed the film cost $13 million rather than the reported $18 million but said with advertising and prints costing $10 million the film lost $10 million. Fraker never directed again and Spilsbury never acted again.

Critical

The film received generally mediocre reviews: Time Out London said, "The mystery is how Fraker, a gifted cameraman who made a superb directing debut in Westerns with Monte Walsh, could produce such a clinker as this."

The Los Angeles Times said "you can have a very good time watching it."

In a 1981 episode of the weekly television movie review program, "Sneak Previews," film critics Gene Siskel (of the Chicago Sun-Times) and Roger Ebert (of the Chicago Tribune) heavily criticized this film. Siskel stated that the movie was "“badly acted and horribly paced." He chastised the tenor of the film, also, stating, "“How about having a sense of humor of the character? You know, enjoying the presentation of the character? You don’t get it from the actor Klinton Spilsbury, and you don’t get it from the filmakers or the director.” Siskel, anticipating a short film career for Spilsbury, added this: "I think it [this movie] is going to provide a great trivia question for the 1990s: Not ‘Who was that Masked Man,’ but who played him? The answer Klinton Spilsbury.” Both Siskel and Ebert noted how it took an hour for The Legend of the Lone Ranger to really get started. Ebert specifically noted, “It’s very slowly paced, and it should have been break-neck [paced] right out of the starting gate... a real disappointing movie.” On behalf of both critics, Siskel summed up the film this way, “Roger [Ebert] and I agree that ‘The Legend of the Lone Ranger’ is a total waste of time... neither one of us can recommend you see it” He refers to it as a “bad Western.”

Movie historian Leonard Maltin gave the picture 2 out of a possible 4 stars, noting "Some fine action, great scenery, and a promising storyline; yet these are sabotaged by awkward handling, uncharismatic leads, and an absolutely awful ballad-style narration. Paging Clayton Moore & Jay Silverheels!"

Sir Lew Grade later wrote, in his 1992 autobiography Still Dancing: My Story, that he thought that the problem with the movie was that it took an hour and ten minutes before the Ranger first pulled on his mask. "The mistake was not dispensing with the legend in ten minutes and getting on with the action much earlier on," his text said.

Kim Newman described the film as "disastrous" and pointed out that Spillsbury has never been heard of again.

Awards and nominations

Merchandise
A novelization of the movie, written by Gary McCarthy and published by Ballantine Books, was released in 1981.

The film was adapted into a newspaper comic published between 1981 and 1984 that was written by Cary Bates and illustrated by Russ Heath.

A line of action figures was created by the toy company Gabriel in 1982, including Buffalo Bill Cody, Butch Cavendish, George Custer, The Lone Ranger, and Tonto. Also released by Gabriel were the horses Silver (The Lone Ranger's Horse), Scout (Tonto's Horse), and Smoke (Butch's Horse).

References

Bibliography

External links
 
 
 
 
 
 
 The Legend of the Lone Ranger Action Figures

1981 Western (genre) films 
1981 films
American Western (genre) films 
Cultural depictions of Buffalo Bill
Cultural depictions of George Armstrong Custer
Cultural depictions of Ulysses S. Grant
Cultural depictions of Wild Bill Hickok
Day of the Dead films
Films adapted into comics
Films scored by John Barry (composer)
Films set in Texas
Films set in 1854
Films set in the 1870s
Films shot in California
Films shot in New Mexico
Films shot in Utah
Golden Raspberry Award winning films
ITC Entertainment films
Lone Ranger films
Universal Pictures films
Films with screenplays by William Roberts (screenwriter)
1980s English-language films
Films directed by William A. Fraker
1980s American films